Nádson da Silva Almeida (born 22 June 1989), simply known as Nádson, is a Brazilian footballer who plays as an attacking midfielder for Botafogo-PB.

Club career
A São Carlos youth graduate, Nádson was born in Lauro de Freitas, Bahia. In 2009, he joined Palmeiras, but failed to make a single appearance for the first team, being only limited to play for the reserve team and serving loan stints at Grêmio Barueri and Ponte Preta; with the latter he made his Série A debut on 20 May 2012, coming on as a second-half substitute for Tony in a 0–1 home loss against Atlético Mineiro.

Nádson subsequently represented Avaí, Bragantino, Audax, Guaratinguetá, Caldense, Sampaio Corrêa and Paraná in quick succession; with the second last he scored a career-best ten goals in the year's Série B. On 28 December 2016, after cutting ties with the latter, he signed a two-year deal with Chapecoense in the first division.

On 28 December 2018, Nádson signed for Botafogo SP.

Career statistics

Honours
Chapecoense
Campeonato Catarinense: 2017

CSA
Campeonato Alagoano: 2021

References

1989 births
Living people
Sportspeople from Bahia
Brazilian footballers
Association football midfielders
Campeonato Brasileiro Série A players
Campeonato Brasileiro Série B players
Campeonato Brasileiro Série C players
São Carlos Futebol Clube players
Sociedade Esportiva Palmeiras players
Grêmio Barueri Futebol players
Associação Atlética Ponte Preta players
Avaí FC players
Clube Atlético Bragantino players
Grêmio Osasco Audax Esporte Clube players
Guaratinguetá Futebol players
Associação Atlética Caldense players
Sampaio Corrêa Futebol Clube players
Paraná Clube players
Associação Chapecoense de Futebol players
Botafogo Futebol Clube (SP) players
Centro Sportivo Alagoano players
Botafogo Futebol Clube (PB) players